Around the World in 18 Days is a 1923 American silent film serial directed by B. Reeves Eason and Robert F. Hill. A total of twelve episodes of the serial were released. The film is now considered lost.

Cast
 William Desmond as Phineas Fogg III
 Laura La Plante as Madge Harlow
 William De Vaull as Jiggs (as William P. DeVaul)
 Wade Boteler as Wallace J. Brenton
 Percy Challenger as Rand
 William Welsh as Matthew Harlow (as William J. Welsh)
 Hamilton Morse as Smith
 Tom Guise as Davis (as Tom S. Guise)
 L.J. O'Connor as Detective (as Louis J. O'Connor)
 Arthur Millett as Detective (as Arthur N. Millett)
 Gordon Sackville as White
 Alfred Hollingsworth as Phineas' Father
 Pat Calhoun as Butler
 Spottiswoode Aitken as Piggott
 Harry De Vere as Book Maker (as Harry T. De Vere)
 Boyd Irwin as Muriarc
 Sidney De Gray as Hyppolyte Darcy (as Sydney De Gray)
 Jean De Briac as Desplayer

See also
 List of American films of 1923
 List of film serials
 List of film serials by studio
 List of lost films

References

External links

1923 films
1923 adventure films
1923 lost films
American adventure films
American silent serial films
American black-and-white films
Films directed by B. Reeves Eason
Films directed by Robert F. Hill
Lost American films
Lost adventure films
Universal Pictures film serials
1920s American films
Silent adventure films